The Apulian regional election of 1970 took place on 7–8 June 1970.

Events
Christian Democracy was by far the largest party, while the Italian Communist Party came distantly second. After the election Christian Democrat Gennaro Trisorio Liuzzi was elected President of the Region at the head of a centre-left coalition (Organic Centre-left).

Results

Source: Ministry of the Interior

Elections in Apulia
1970 elections in Italy